Beacham is a surname. 

Notable people with the surname include:

Robert Beacham (or Beauchamp), founding settler of Norwalk, Connecticut
Braxton Beacham (1864-1924), Mayor of Orlando, Florida (1902)
Jack Beacham (1902-1982), English footballer
Joseph Beacham (1874-1958), American football college coach
Stephanie Beacham (born 1947), English actress
Susan Beacham (born 1958), American personal finance expert
Travis Beacham (born 1980), American screenwriter

Places that begin with "Beacham" include:

Beacham Theatre (built 1921), historic cinema in Orlando, Florida constructed by Braxton Beacham

See also 
 Beauchamp (disambiguation)
 Beecham
 Miller & Beacham, music publishing company

English-language surnames